Order of the Republic may refer to:

 Order of the Republic (Barbados)
 Order of the Republic (China)
 Order of the Republic (Egypt)
 Order of the Republic (Gambia)
 Order of the Republic (Moldova)
 Order of the Republic (Serbia)
 Order of the Republic (Sudan)
 Order of the Republic (Sierra Leone)
 Order of the Republic (Tunisia)
 Order of the Republic (Turkey)
 Order of the Republic (Uruguay)